The Gulf flashlightfish (Phthanophaneron harveyi) is a species of saltwater fish of the family Anomalopidae, also known as lanterneye fish, of the order Beryciformes. It is endemic to the Gulf of California. This cryptic fish is the only known member of its genus. It was first reported in the Pacific Ocean in 1976 and is extremely rare.

Taxonomy
Its genus name comes from Greek: "phthano" meaning "to arrive the first", and "phaneros" meaning "visible." It was named "harveyi" after American zoologist and leading bioluminescence authority Edmund Newton Harvey. It was originally classified as a species of Kryptophanaron along with the Atlantic flashlightfish, but was later moved to its own genus.

Description
Although some sources list its maximum size as  TL, a 1986 paper claims that a female specimen was caught with a length of  SL.

Oblong body; Large head, bones of the head and shoulder girdle are sculptured with numerous spine-bearing ridges; Broad ridges and skin separate the sensory canals at the top of the head; short and blunt snout; oblique mouth, moderately sized; teeth small and conical; large eye that is wider than the snout; only one papilla is found behind the eye; dorsal fin is in two parts; caudal fin deeply forked; small and rough scales; approximately 80 in longitudinal series on upper side; row of 12-13 enlarged and keeled scales.

Blackish-brown with no reflective markings on body; prominent pearly white luminous organ under eye

Distribution and habitat
Phthanophaneron harveyi is found only in the eastern Pacific Ocean off the coast of Baja California. It is only known from four specimens. It is associated with reefs and can be found over soft and rocky substrates.

Relationship with humans
Although it has been displayed in public aquariums, little is known about P. harveyi. It has been caught by shrimp trawlers, but only "very rarely."

Reproduction 
Panamic flashlightfish reproduces through unguarded pelagic eggs.

Conservation facts 
Due to being data deficient, little is known about the Panamic flashlightfish although it is unique and cannot be confused with other species. It is extremely rare and has only been caught 15 times since the first capture In 1976.

References

External links
 

Gulf flashlightfish
Fish of the Gulf of California
Gulf flashlightfish
Taxa named by Richard Heinrich Rosenblatt